The brown-chested lapwing (Vanellus superciliosus) is a species of bird in the family Charadriidae.
It resides year-round in a narrow strip of land from southwestern Nigeria to northeastern Democratic Republic of the Congo; its wintering range extends toward Lake Chad, Lake Victoria and northern Zambia.

It is a carnivorous bird feeding on insects, larvae, crickets, bugs, grasshoppers etc. Their preferred habitat is grassy lands, open savannas or grounds of Mopane forests.

References

brown-chested lapwing
Birds of Sub-Saharan Africa
brown-chested lapwing
Taxonomy articles created by Polbot
Taxa named by Anton Reichenow